A seedling is young plant after germination from seeds (sometimes also referred to as sprouts).

Seedling may also refer to:

Seedlings (novel), a book in the Deathlands series by James Axler
Seedlings (film), a Pakistani film directed by Mansoor Mujahid
Seedlings (gumball), a type of gumball candy

See also
Seed (disambiguation)
Seeding (disambiguation)
Seedling bed, a specially prepared box used to grow plants
Chance seedling, a plant cultivar discovered by chance